Naraling is a locality in the Mid West region of Western Australia.

References 

Towns in Western Australia
Mid West (Western Australia)